Justice Beatty may refer to:

Donald W. Beatty, associate justice of the South Carolina Supreme Court
H. O. Beatty, associate justice of the Supreme Court of Nevada
Samuel A. Beatty, associate justice of the Supreme Court of Alabama
William H. Beatty, chief justice of the Supreme Court of Nevada and later of the Supreme Court of California

See also
Judge Beatty (disambiguation)